The Men's artistic team all-around competition at the 2018 Mediterranean Games was held between the 23–24 June 2018 at the Pavelló Olímpic de Reus. The event also served as qualification for the individual all-around competition and individual apparatus finals.

Qualified teams

The following NOCs qualified a team for the event.

Final
The top 3 scores on each apparatus counted towards the total team score. The scores highlighted in bold counted towards the total team score.

Source:

References

Men's artistic team all-around
2018
Mediterranean Games